Drogheda (meaning "bridge at the ford") is an industrial and port town in County Louth on the east coast of Ireland,  north of Dublin. Drogheda has a population of approximately 41,000 inhabitants (2016), making it the eleventh largest settlement by population in all of Ireland, and the largest town in the Republic of Ireland by both population and area. It is the last bridging point on the River Boyne before it enters the Irish Sea.

Drogheda was founded as two separately administered towns in two different territories: Drogheda-in-Meath (i.e. the Lordship and Liberty of Meath, from which a charter was granted in 1194) and Drogheda-in-Oriel (or 'Uriel', as County Louth was then known). The division came from the twelfth-century boundary between two Irish kingdoms, colonised by different Norman interests, just as the River Boyne continues to divide the town between the dioceses of Armagh and Meath. In 1412 these two towns were united, and Drogheda became a county corporate, styled as "the County of the Town of Drogheda". Drogheda continued as a county borough until the establishment of county councils under the Local Government (Ireland) Act 1898, which saw all of Drogheda, including a large area south of the Boyne, become part of an extended County Louth. With the passing of the County of Louth and Borough of Drogheda (Boundaries) Provisional Order 1976, County Louth again grew larger at the expense of County Meath. The boundary was further altered in 1994 by the Local Government (Boundaries) (Town Elections) Regulations 1994. The 2007–2013 Meath County Development Plan recognises the Meath environs of Drogheda as a primary growth centre on a par with Navan.

The town was selected to host Fleadh Cheoil na hÉireann for two years in 2018.

History

Hinterland

The town is situated in an area which contains a number of archaeological monuments dating from the Neolithic period onwards, of which the large passage tombs of Newgrange, Knowth, and Dowth are probably the best known. The density of archaeological sites of the prehistoric and early Christian periods uncovered in the course of ongoing developments, (including during construction of the Northern Motorway or 'Drogheda Bypass'), have shown that the hinterland of Drogheda has been a settled landscape for millennia.

Town beginnings

Despite local tradition linking Millmount to Amergin Glúingel, in his 1978 study of the history and archaeology of the town, John Bradley stated that "neither the documentary nor the archaeological evidence indicates that there was any settlement at the town prior to the coming of the Normans". The results of a number of often large-scale excavations carried out within the area of the medieval town appear to confirm this statement.

One of the earliest structures in the town is the motte-and-bailey castle, now known as Millmount Fort, which overlooks the town from a bluff on the south bank of the Boyne and which was probably erected by the Norman Lord of Meath, Hugh de Lacy, sometime before 1186. The wall on the east side of Rosemary Lane, a back-lane which runs from St. Laurence Street towards the Augustinian Church, is the oldest stone structure in Drogheda. It was completed in 1234 as the west wall of the first castle guarding access to the northern crossing point of the Boyne. A later castle, circa 1600, called Laundy's Castle stood at the junction of West Street and Peter's Street. On Meathside, the Castle of Drogheda or The Castle of Comfort was a tower house castle on the south side of the Bull Ring. It served as a prison, a sitting of the Irish parliament in 1494, and later as a tholsel building. The earliest known town charter is that granted to Drogheda-in-Meath by Walter de Lacy in 1194. In the 1600s, the name of the town was also spelled "Tredagh" in keeping with the common pronunciation, as documented by Gerard Boate in his work Irelands' Natural History. In c. 1655 it was spelled "Droghedagh" on a map by William Farriland.

Drogheda was an important walled town in the English Pale in the medieval period. It frequently hosted meetings of the Irish Parliament at that time. According to R.J. Mitchell in John Tiptoft, Earl of Worcester, in a spill-over from the War of the Roses the Earl of Desmond and his two youngest sons (still children) were executed there on Valentine's Day 1468 on orders of the Earl of Worcester, the Lord Deputy of Ireland. It later came to light (for example in Robert Fabyan's The New Chronicles of England and France), that Elizabeth Woodville, the queen consort, was implicated in the orders given. The parliament was moved to the town in 1494 and passed Poynings' Law, the most significant legislation in Irish history, a year later. This effectively subordinated the Irish Parliament's legislative powers to the King and his English Council.

Later events

The town was besieged twice during the Irish Confederate Wars.

In the second siege of Drogheda, an assault was made on the town from the south, the tall walls breached, and the town was taken by Oliver Cromwell on 11 September 1649, as part of the Cromwellian conquest of Ireland and it was the site of a massacre of the Royalist defenders. In his own words after the siege of Drogheda, "When they submitted, their officers were knocked on the head, and every tenth man of the soldiers killed and the rest shipped to Barbados."

The Earldom of Drogheda was created in the Peerage of Ireland in 1661.

In 1790, Drogheda Harbour Commissioners were established. They remained in place until 1997 when the Drogheda Port Company a commercial enterprise replaced them.

In 1825, the Drogheda Steam Packet Company was formed in the town, providing shipping services to Liverpool.

In 1837, the population of Drogheda area was 17,365 people, of whom 15,138 lived in the town.

Town arms
Drogheda's coat of arms features St. Laurence's Gate with three lions, and a ship emerging from either side of the barbican. The town's motto Deus praesidium, mercatura decus translates as "God our strength, merchandise our glory".

The star and crescent emblem in the crest of the coat of arms is mentioned as part of the mayor's seal 
by D'Alton (1844).
In 2010, Irish president Mary McAleese, in a speech delivered during an official visit to Turkey, stated that the star and crescent had been added in the aftermath of the Great Famine as gratitude for food supplies donated by the Ottoman Sultan, which had arrived at Drogheda by ship. Irish press quickly pointed out the story was a myth, with a local historian calling it 'nothing short of sheer nonsense'. However, later evidence, including a letter displayed at the office of the European Commission, confirms that Turkey came to the aid of the Irish during the Famine.

20th century

In 1921, the preserved severed head of Saint Oliver Plunkett, who was executed in London in 1681, was put on display in St. Peter's (Catholic) Church, where it remains today. The church is located on West Street, which is the main street in the town.

In 1979, Pope John Paul II visited Drogheda as part of his five-stop tour of Ireland. He arrived less than a month after the IRA assassination of Lord Mountbatten, Queen Elizabeth's cousin, in Mullaghmore. On 29 September 1979, he arrived in Dublin, where he gave his first mass. He then addressed 300,000 people in Drogheda, where he appealed "on his knees" to paramilitaries to end the violence in Ireland:
"Now I wish to speak to all men and women engaged in violence. I appeal to you, in language of passionate pleading. On my knees I beg you to turn away from the paths of violence and to return to the ways of peace. You may claim to seek justice. I too believe in justice and seek justice. But violence only delays the day of justice. Violence destroys the work of justice. Further violence in Ireland will only drag down to ruin the land you claim to love and the values you claim to cherish."

21st century

Two decades into the 21st century some of the historic core of Drogheda town has suffered urban decline. Some of the buildings have been derelict for some years and are in danger of collapse. There was a 2006 traffic plan for pedestrianisation of West Street. It was rejected at a vote of the elected councillors. They had come under pressure from traders in the area concerned about a potential further decline in customer footfall. But the issue has come up for debate again. When asked, Drogheda residents point out that a combination of expensive car-parking and high commercial rates had a push-pull effect on the town's centre. Shops were forced to close and at the same time shoppers brought their business to retail parks such as the Boyne Shopping Centre on Bolton Street. A substantial root-and-branch approach to renewal of the locality was proposed in “Westgate Vision: A Townscape Recovery Guide”. The Westgate area of Drogheda is to be subject to a 10-year regeneration by Louth County Council.

Demographics
Drogheda has a hinterland of 70,000+ within a  radius. According to the 2016 census, there were 40,956 people living in Drogheda town at that time.

As of the 2011 census, non-Irish nationals accounted for 16.1% of the population, compared with a national average of 12%. Polish nationals (1,127) were the largest group, followed by Lithuanian nationals (1,044 people). As of the 2016 census, 17.4% of the population were non-Irish nationals, with 676 people from the UK, 1,324 Polish nationals, 1,014 Lithuanians, 1,798 people from elsewhere in the EU, and 1,400 with other (non-EU) nationalities.

Arts and entertainment

Music
Drogheda has hosted the national traditional music festival, Fleadh Cheoil na hÉireann, in 2018 and again in 2019.

Drogheda is home to two brass bands: Drogheda Brass Band and Lourdes Brass Band. The town is known nationally for its choral tradition which goes back many years.

Drogheda hosted the international summer Samba festival in which Samba bands from around the world came to the town for three days of drumming and parades.

The composer and member of Aosdána, Michael Holohan, has lived in Drogheda since 1983. His compositions have been performed and broadcast both at home and internationally. Career highlights in Drogheda include Cromwell 1994, 'Drogheda 800' (RTECO, Lourdes Church); The Mass of Fire 1995, 'Augustinian 700' (RTÉ TV live broadcast); No Sanctuary 1997 with Nobel Laureate and poet Seamus Heaney (Augustinian Church); Remembrance Sunday Service and Drogheda Unification 600 (RTE TV live broadcast, St Peter's Church of Ireland) and two major concerts with The Boyne Valley Chamber Orchestra at Fleadh Cheoil na hÉireann in 2018 and 2019.

Drogheda regularly hosts “Music at the Gate”, a community-run event led by uilleann piper Darragh Ó Heiligh, next to Saint Laurence’s Gate in the centre of Drogheda. Other notable musicians from Drogheda include SJ McCardle, Drill Rappers A92, Seán Mathews and The Voice Squad.

Visual arts
October 2006 saw the opening of The Highlanes Gallery, the town's first dedicated municipal art gallery. Its location is the former Franciscan Church and Friary on St. Laurence Street. The gallery houses Drogheda's important municipal art collection, which dates from the 17th century. Drogheda's most famous visual artist was the abstract expressionist painter Nano Reid (1900–1981).

Places of interest

Drogheda is an ancient town that has a growing tourism industry. Other tourist sites in the area include:

Millmount Fort and museum
Saint Laurence Gate barbican gate  1300s
John Philip Holland memorial (sculpture commemorating submarine inventor)
Boyne Viaduct
John Jameson's residential home (not open to the public), and a Jameson distillery trail of malthouses in the town.
Battle Of The Boyne Site, visitors centre 
Éamonn Ceannt's school (formerly St Joseph's CBS now operates as Scholars Hotel)
Beaulieu House and Gardens
Mellifont Abbey
Townley Hall nature trail and woods
Princess Grace Rose Garden at St. Dominic's Park
St. Peter's Roman Catholic Church, which houses a shrine of Oliver Plunkett
St Peter's Church of Ireland church, on Peter's Hill
Highlanes Gallery
Augustinian Church 'The Passion Window' Harry Clarke Studio

Industry and economy

Drogheda has several international companies based in the town. Local employers include Coca-Cola International Services, State Street International Services, Natures Best, Yapstone Inc, the Drogheda Port Company, Glanbia and Flogas.

Drogheda also has a history of brewing and distilling, with companies Jameson Whiskey, Coca-Cola, Guinness, Jack Daniel's all having previously produced (or are still producing) their products in or near the town. These include the Boann distillery and brewery, Slane Whiskey (a Jack Daniel's-owned company), Listoke House, Dan Kellys (cider), and Jack Codys. The town formerly distilled Prestons whiskey, a Jameson Whiskey brand; Cairnes Beer, founded locally and sold to Guinness; and Coca-Cola concentrate.

Transport, communications and amenities

Road links and infrastructure
Drogheda is located close to the M1 (E1 Euro Route 1) (main Dublin – Belfast motorway). It was opened on 9 June 2003 and is the longest cable-stayed bridge in Ireland. The town's postcode, or eircode, is A92.

Railway
Drogheda acquired rail links to Dublin in 1844, Navan in 1850 and Belfast in 1852. Passenger services between Drogheda and Navan were ended in 1958, however the line remains open for freight (Tara Mines/Platin Cement) traffic. In 1966 Drogheda station was renamed "MacBride". Drogheda railway station opened on 25 May 1844.

The station has direct trains on the Enterprise northbound to Dundalk,  and Belfast Central, and southbound to Dublin Connolly. 1 Train a day to Belfast skips Drogheda

Bus transport
Drogheda's bus station is located on Donore Road. Past Bus Éireann routes included the 184 to Garristown and 185 to Bellewstown.

Administration

Drogheda was one of ten boroughs retained under the Municipal Corporations (Ireland) Act 1840. Under the Local Government (Ireland) Act 1898, the area became an urban district, while retaining the style of a borough corporation.

Drogheda Borough Corporation became a borough council in 2002. On 1 June 2014, the borough council was dissolved and the administration of the town was amalgamated with Louth County Council. It retains the right to be described as a borough. The chair of the borough district uses the title of mayor, rather than Cathaoirleach. The mayor, elected in June 2019 for the period 2019–2020, was Paul Bell (Labour).

As of the 2019 Louth County Council election, the borough district of Drogheda contains the local electoral areas of Drogheda Urban (6 seats) and Drogheda Rural (4 seats), electing 10 seats to the council.

The parliamentary borough of Drogheda returned two MPs to the Irish House of Commons until 1801. Under the Act of Union, the parliamentary borough returned one MP to the United Kingdom House of Commons, until its abolition under the Redistribution of Seats Act 1885. It was thereafter represented by the South Louth from 1885 to 1918, by County Louth from 1918 to 1922, by Louth–Meath from 1921 to 1923, and by the Dáil constituency of Louth from 1923 to the present.

Media
The local newspapers are the Drogheda Leader and the Drogheda Independent and known locally as The Leader and D.I.. Both newspapers are published weekly. The office of  The Drogheda Independent is in Dundalk and The Drogheda Leader'''s offices are at 13/14 West Street.

The local radio station is LMFM, broadcasting on 95.8 FM. The headquarters of LMFM is on Marley's Lane on the south side of the town.

Hospitals and health care
Drogheda is a regional centre for medical care. Its main hospital is Our Lady of Lourdes Hospital, a public hospital located in the town. and is part of the Louth Meath Hospital Group. Facilities include a 24-hour emergency department for the populations of County Louth, County Meath and the North-East of Ireland. The hospital provides 340 beds, of which 30 are reserved for acute day cases.

The Cottage Hospital on Scarlet Street is a former maternity hospital, which subsequently became a Geriatric Unit for a number of years.

Education
There are six secondary schools situated in Drogheda. St. Joseph's secondary school in Newfoundwell is an all-boys school, as is St. Marys Diocesan School on Beamore Rd. The Sacred Heart School, situated in Sunnyside Drogheda, is an all-girls school. The Drogheda Grammar school, located on Mornington Road, St. Oliver's Community College, on Rathmullen Road, and Ballymakenny College, on the Ballymakenny Road, are mixed schools. Our Lady's College, in Greenhills is an all-girls school. There is also Drogheda Institute for Further Education (DIFE), a third-level college situated in Moneymore townland.

Sport
The town's association football team, Drogheda United, was formed in 1919, and their home matches are played at Head In The Game Park. Nicknamed "The Drogs", they currently compete in the League of Ireland Premier Division, which they won for the first time in 2007. The club achieved success by winning the FAI Cup in 2005, and back to back Setanta Sports Cup successes in 2006 and 2007, along with the 2012 EA Sports Cup. The Drogs came close to UEFA Champions League qualification on 2 occasions, in 2008 and 2013. They also narrowly missed out on a UEFA Cup place twice, in 2006 and 2007. Since their formation, the club have won 11 major honours. In 2011, Drogheda became the sister club of Turkish club Trabzonspor due to their matching colours, and the town's history of Ottoman assistance during the Great Famine.

In rugby union, the local Boyne RFC team was formed in 1997 from the amalgamation of Delvin RFC and Drogheda RFC. , the men's 1st XV team were playing in the Leinster J1 1st division.

Town twinning
Bronte, Italy
Saint-Mandé, France
Salinas, United States

People

Arts and media
Yasmine Akram, comedian and actress in Sherlock
Pierce Brosnan, actor, film producer and environmentalist was born in Drogheda
Eamonn Campbell, member of The Dubliners
James Chadwick, theologian, lyricist and Archbishop of Newcastle and Hexham
Alison Comyn, journalist and broadcaster 
Susan Connolly, poet, Patrick and Katherine Kavanagh Fellowship 2001
Daniele Formica, actor, stage director and playwright was born in Drogheda
Angela Greene, poet, Patrick Kavanagh Award 1988, Salmon Press
Michael Holohan, composer, member and former chair of Aosdána
Jonathan Kelly, singer-songwriter
Courtney Love, singer, actress and wife of Kurt Cobain
Colin O'Donoghue, actor known for his role of Captain Hook/Killian Jones in the American TV Show Once Upon a Time''
Hector Ó hEochagáin, broadcaster and podcaster
Deirdre O'Kane, actress and casting director
Eliza O'Neill, actress.
John Boyle O'Reilly, poet and novelist, member of the Irish Republican Brotherhood
Nano Reid, painter of landscapes, particularly Drogheda, the Boyne Valley and surrounding areas
Fiachra Trench, composer. Penned the string arrangement for fairytale of New York wrote music for many Hollywood movies
Offica, drill rapper

Politics and diplomacy
Éamonn Ceannt 1916 Rising Leader – secondary school student in St Joseph CBS Drogheda
Damien English, Minister of State at the Department of Enterprise, Trade and Employment and TD for Meath West
Paddy O'Hanlon, a former Nationalist MP for South Armagh
William Hughes, Irish-born US senator from New Jersey
Alison Kelly, Irish ambassador to Israel
Tony Martin, Canadian social democratic legislator
Dominic McGlinchey, INLA leader, assassinated 10 February 1994
Ged Nash, Irish Politician, Labour Party. Former Mayor of Drogheda 2004–2005. Served as Minister of State for Business and Employment from 2014 to 2016. He was a Senator for the Labour Panel from 2016 to 2020. Currently TD 2020–present (Previously 2011–2016)
Geraldine Byrne Nason diplomat, Irish Ambassador to the United Nations
John Neary Diplomat. Ambassador to Netherlands 
Henry Singleton, judge and friend of Jonathan Swift, was a lifelong resident of Drogheda
Peadar Toibin, TD for Meath West and leader of Aontú
T. K. Whitaker, former Irish economist who wrote the Programme for Economic Expansion

Military
John Barrett Captain of HMS Minotaur (1793) and HMS Africa (1781)
Rear-Admiral James Figgins Captain of HMS Newcastle (C76) .WW2
George Forbes, 3rd Earl of Granard Naval Officer
William Kenny, recipient of the Victoria Cross
Thomas Charles Wright Admiral and Genera A founder of the Ecuadorian Navy/

Business
John Jameson, Founder of Jameson Irish Whiskey lived in Distillery House, Dyer Street.

Academia and science
James Cullen, mathematician who discovered what are now known as the Cullen numbers.
John Philip Holland, inventor of the modern-day submarine.
Thomas McLaughlin ESB founder and first CEO. Built the Shannon Hydro Electric Plant.
Michael Scott, architect who designed Busáras and the Abbey Theatre

Religion
Patrick Curtis Archbishop of Armagh, Spymaster for the Duke of Wellington in the Peninsular War. No 1 on Napoleon's most wanted list. 
Thomas Lancaster, bishop, buried at St. Peter's Church

Sport
Keane Barry, professional PDC darts player
Tommy Breen, Manchester United goalkeeper
Gavin Brennan, midfielder for Warrenpoint Town, Drogheda United and Shamrock Rovers. Brother of footballer Killian Brennan.
Killian Brennan, midfielder with several League of Ireland clubs, and winner of 3 League of Ireland's, 3 FAI Cup's and 5 League Cup's
Tommy Byrne, former racing driver, raced briefly in Formula 1 in 1982
Tony Byrne, bronze medal winner for Ireland 1956 Summer Olympics in Melbourne in the lightweight division.
Megan Campbell, Liverpool association footballer
Jerome Clarke, former Drogheda United forward, earned one cap for the Republic of Ireland.
Nick Colgan, goalkeeper for Chelsea, Hibernian and the Republic of Ireland.
Barry Conlon, former Manchester City Striker
Mick Fairclough, Former Irish International (English Premier League of that era )
Bernard Flynn, member of the Meath football team during the 80’s and 90’s
Paddy Gavin, former full-back for Dundalk, Doncaster Rovers and Republic of Ireland B
Deirdre Gogarty, 1997 Women's International Boxing Federation (WIBF) Featherweight Title Champion.
James Hand, footballer for Huddersfield Town
Ian Harte, former footballer with several English clubs and the Republic of Ireland national football team.
Gary Kelly, football player and charity campaigner.
Colin Lowth, an Olympic swimmer who represented Ireland at the 2000 Summer Olympics in Sydney.
David McAllister, midfielder for Sheffield United, Shrewsbury Town and Stevenage.
Shane Monahan, Professional rugby player, Gloucester, Leinster, Munster, Connaught, Ireland U-21s International. 
Des Smyth, professional golfer, vice-captain on the winning Ryder Cup team in 2006
Steve Staunton, former Liverpool and Aston Villa defender and Republic of Ireland captain and manager was born there.
Gary Tallon, midfielder for Mansfield Town
Kevin Thornton, former footballer with several English clubs and the Republic of Ireland under 21s
Sean Thornton, former footballer with several English clubs and the Republic of Ireland under 21 national team, former Sunderland Player of the Year

Other
Sir John Lumsden, founder of St John Ambulance Ireland
Jill Meagher, crime victim

Freedom of the Town
The following people have received the Freedom of the Town of Drogheda.
Charles Stewart Parnell: 1884.
Éamon de Valera: July 1933.
Pope John Paul II: 29 September 1979.
John Hume: 14 May 2001.
Father Iggy O’Donovan: 23 October 2013.
Michael D. Higgins: 22 May 2015.
Seamus Mallon: 8 June 2018.
Geraldine Byrne Nason: 10 January 2020.

See also
List of abbeys and priories in Ireland (County Louth)
List of towns and villages in Ireland

References

Further reading

External links

Drogheda Borough Council
Drogheda on the Boyne – Official Tourism Website
Drogheda & District Chamber of Commerce

 
911 establishments
Port cities and towns in the Republic of Ireland
Port cities and towns of the Irish Sea
Towns and villages in County Louth
Boroughs in the Republic of Ireland
10th-century establishments in Ireland